John Rhys-Davies (born 5 May 1944) is a Welsh actor known for portraying Sallah in the Indiana Jones franchise and Gimli in The Lord of the Rings trilogy. He has also received three Screen Actors Guild Award nominations with one win, and a Primetime Emmy Award nomination.

Rhys-Davies is also known for his performances in the films Victor/Victoria (1982), The Living Daylights (1987), The Princess Diaries 2: Royal Engagement (2004), and Aquaman (2018). He is also known for his extensive voice work including in Aladdin and the King of Thieves (1996), The Jungle Book 2 (2003), Gargoyles (1995-1996), and SpongeBob SquarePants (2000-2002). He portrayed Hades in Justice League (2002).

He also gained acclaim for his television roles as Macro in I, Claudius (1976), Vasco Rodrigues in Shōgun (1980), and Michael Malone in The Untouchables (1993) From 1995 to 1997 he portrayed Professor Maximillian Arturo in Sliders.

Early life
John Rhys-Davies was born in Salisbury on 5 May 1944, the son of Welsh parents. His mother, Phyllis Jones, was a nurse, while his father, Rhys Davies, was a mechanical engineer and colonial officer. 

Due to his father's work as a colonial police officer, he was raised in Tanganyika (today part of Tanzania) before his family moved to the Welsh town of Ammanford. While in Tanganyika, his family lived in places such as Dar es Salaam, Kongwa, Moshi, and Mwanza. He was educated at independent Truro School in Cornwall and then at the University of East Anglia, where he was one of the first 105 students admitted and became a co-founder of its drama club. After a stint teaching at a secondary school in Watton, Norfolk, he won a place at the Royal Academy of Dramatic Art in London.

Career

Rhys-Davies appeared sporadically on UK television in the early 1970s, including his role as the gangster "Laughing Spam Fritter" opposite Adam Faith in Budgie. Later he played Praetorian officer Naevius Sutorius Macro in I, Claudius. He then began to appear more frequently, and not just in the UK, with roles as a Portuguese navigator Rodrigues in the 1980 television miniseries Shogun, based on the novel by James Clavell, and as Sallah in the 1981 film Raiders of the Lost Ark. He reprised the role of Sallah in two subsequent Indiana Jones films. 

In 1989, he played Marvel Comics character Kingpin in The Trial of the Incredible Hulk. Rhys-Davies also starred in another Clavell adaption, Noble House, set in Hong Kong, in which he plays Ian Dunross' corporate enemy, Quillan Gornt. He has since appeared in numerous television shows and miniseries, including Agent Michael Malone in the 1993 remake of the 1950s television series The Untouchables as well as a leading role in the television series Sliders as Professor Maximillian Arturo from 1995 to 1997.

He also appeared in Reilly, Ace of Spies in 1983, made several appearances in Star Trek: Voyager as a holodeck version of Leonardo da Vinci, starred as an ally of James Bond in The Living Daylights, and appeared in the film One Night with the King. Davies has played the character Porthos in two separate projects; a two-part episode of The Secret Adventures of Jules Verne, and the Hallmark Channel film La Femme Musketeer. He appears in the full motion video cut scenes of computer games including Ripper (as Vigo Haman) (1996), Dune 2000 (as Noree Moneo) (1998), and the Wing Commander series (as James Taggart, doubling as the voice of Thrakhath nar Kiranka in the third game of the series).

In 2004, he narrated The Privileged Planet, a documentary that makes the case for intelligent design. In 2013, he appeared in the family history programme Coming Home, in which he discovered information about his grandfather's life in the Carmarthenshire coal mines.

In 2014, he joined the cast of the television show Metal Hurlant Chronicles to play Holgarth, an immortal alchemist.

In 2015, he had a role in the single-player campaign of the PC game Star Citizen alongside Mark Hamill and Gary Oldman. The work consisted of full body motion capture, including facial expressions and his voice; it was recorded primarily at the Imaginarium studios in the UK.

The Lord of the Rings trilogy
Rhys-Davies appeared as the dwarf Gimli in The Lord of the Rings trilogy. Therefore, although his character was supposed to be short, he was properly in proportion compared to the hobbit actors. Had he been of more similar height, shots of the entire fellowship would have required three camera passes rather than two.

Rhys-Davies is the only one of the nine Fellowship of the Ring actors who did not receive a tattoo of the word "nine" written in the Tengwar script; his stunt double, Brett Beattie, was offered the tattoo instead as Rhys-Davies was disinclined to get one himself and Beattie had spent so much time as his double that he almost received co-credit.

Rhys-Davies suffered severe reactions to the prosthetics used during filming, and his eyes sometimes swelled shut. When asked whether he would consider returning to the role for the film version of The Hobbit, he said, "I have already completely ruled it out. There's a sentimental part of me that would love to be involved again. Really I am not sure my face can take that sort of punishment any more." He added that this time around "[t]hey've got a different set of problems... because you've got 13 dwarves, a whole band of them... You're trying to represent a whole race... You're trying to do for dwarves what The Lord of the Rings did for hobbits." He offered help as a dwarf advisor in 2011, but ruled out returning as Gimli in The Hobbit because of the punishing makeup required.

Rhys-Davies, together with Sean Astin, Sean Bean, Orlando Bloom, Billy Boyd, Ian McKellen, Dominic Monaghan, Viggo Mortensen, Miranda Otto, Andy Serkis, Liv Tyler, Karl Urban, and Elijah Wood, plus writer Philippa Boyens and director Peter Jackson on 31 May 2020 joined Josh Gad's YouTube series Reunited Apart, which reunites the cast of popular movies through video-conferencing and promotes donations to non-profit charities.

Voice work

In addition to voicing the Ent Treebeard in Lord of the Rings, Rhys-Davies has lent his distinctive voice to many video games and animated television series, including the role of Hades in Justice League, the original voice of Man Ray in SpongeBob SquarePants (until both roles were recast to Bob Joles), and numerous times in Gargoyles (1994–1996), as the character Macbeth. He also lent his vocal talents to the games Freelancer (as Richard Winston Tobias) and Lords of Everquest (both in 2003) and the game Quest for Glory IV: Shadows of Darkness, which was released with his narration on a CD-ROM version in 1995. He also had a voice role on Baldur's Gate: Dark Alliance as the character Jherek, and narrated a documentary called The Glory of Macedonia. Next Generation magazine gave its Dune 2000 review 'an automatic one-star deduction for featuring John "Multimedia Whore" Rhys-Davies in the FMV.'

John Rhys-Davies' voice can be heard on the 2009 documentary Reclaiming The Blade. In the narration, Rhys-Davies explores swords, historical European swordsmanship and fight choreography on film, a topic very familiar to him from his experiences in The Lord of the Rings trilogy, where his character wielded an axe in many scenes.

In 2004, he was the unknowing subject of an internet prank that spread false rumours in several mainstream media sources that he was scheduled to play the role of General Grievous in Star Wars Episode III.

Rhys-Davies is the narrator of The Truth & Life Dramatized audio New Testament Bible, a 22-hour, celebrity-voiced, fully dramatised audiobook version of the New Testament which uses the Revised Standard Version-Catholic Edition translation. In 2011, he presented KJB: The Book That Changed The World, which features him reading diverse snippets from the King James Version.

John Rhys-Davies’ voice work also includes voice-over work with Breathe Bible.

In 2016, he provided spoken words for Voices of Fire, the sixth album by a cappella power metal band van Canto.

A resident of the Isle of Man since 1988, John Rhys-Davies provides the introductory voice-over to the Island's Castle Rushen, one of the best-preserved medieval fortresses in Britain. In 2018, he lent his voice to the Isle of Man's tourism commercial.

Rhys-Davies voice was recorded for some of the callouts in the 1993 Williams SuperPin Indiana Jones: The Pinball Adventure

Personal life

Relationships

Rhys-Davies married Suzanne Wilkinson in December 1966, and they had two sons together. Although they legally separated in 1985, they remained married until her death from Alzheimer's disease in 2010. They remained friends, and he took care of her in her final years.

In 2004, Rhys-Davies began dating Lisa Manning. They have a daughter together, and split their time between homes in the New Zealand region of Waikato and on the Isle of Man.

Religious views
Rhys-Davies is a self-described "rationalist" and "sceptic" when it comes to religion. However, he holds Christianity in high regard and has stated that "Christian civilisation has made the world a better place than it ever was."

In February 2020, Rhys-Davies stated, "All the things that we value, the right of free speech, the right of the individual conscience, these evolved in first and second century Roman Christendom, where the individual Christian said, 'I have a right to believe, [sic] what I believe and not what the Emperor tells me.' From that our whole idea of democracy and the equality that we have has developed. We owe Christianity the greatest debt of thanks that a generation can ever have, and to slight it and to dismiss it as being irrelevant is the detritus of rather ill-read minds, I think."

Rhys-Davies has played roles in several Christian films, including Mordecai in One Night with the King (2006), Charles Kemp in Beyond the Mask (2015), Saint Peter in The Apostle Peter: Redemption (2016), the Evangelist in The Pilgrim's Progress (2019), and Saint Patrick in I Am Patrick (2020).

Political views
Rhys-Davies is not a member of any political party. He was a radical leftist as a university student in the 1960s, but changed his views when he went to heckle Margaret Thatcher, who he said "shot down the first two hecklers in such brilliant fashion that [he] decided [he] ought for once to shut up and listen".

In 2004, Rhys-Davies said in an interview with World magazine, "There is a demographic catastrophe happening in Europe that nobody wants to talk about, that we daren't bring up because we are so cagey about not offending people racially. And rightly we should be. But there is a cultural thing as well. By 2020, 50% of the children in Holland under the age of 18 will be of Muslim descent." In an interview with the conservative journal National Review, he said that he is opposed to Islamic extremism because he feels that it violates the "Western values" of equality, democracy, tolerance, and the abolition of slavery.

Rhys-Davies was vocal about his support for Brexit. On 25 April 2019, he appeared as a panellist on the BBC's Question Time, where his conduct was described as "thuggish and sexist" by some viewers after he shouted "oh, woman!" at Green Party politician Caroline Lucas when she commented on Donald Trump's victory in the 2016 U.S. presidential election.

Filmography

Film

Television 
{| class="wikitable sortable"
|-
! Year
! Title
! Role
! Notes
|-
| 1974
| Fall of Eagles
| Grigory Zinoviev
| Episode: "The Secret War"
|- 
| 1975
| The Sweeney
| Ron Brett
| Episode: "Poppy"
|-
| rowspan=2 | 1976
| I, Claudius
| Naevius Sutorius Macro
| 2 episodes
|-
| Warship
| CPO Cook Mantell
| Episode: "Heart of Oak"
|-
| rowspan=2 | 1977
| 1990| Ivor Griffith
| Episode: "Health Farm"
|-
| Just William| Authority 
| Episode: "William and the Wonderful Present"
|-
| rowspan=2 | 1978
| Z Cars 
| Terry Larkin 
| Episode: "Fat Freddie B.A."
|-
| The Nativity| Nestor 
| Television film
|-
| 1979–80
| BBC Television Shakespeare| Eustace Chapuys, Salerio
| 2 episodes
|-
| 1979
| The Danedyke Mystery| Armchair
| 6 episodes
|-
| 1980
| Shōgun| Vasco Rodrigues
| MiniseriesNominated—Primetime Emmy Award for Outstanding Supporting Actor in a Miniseries or a Movie
|-
| 1981
| Peter and Paul| Silas 
| Television film
|-
| rowspan=2 | 1982
| CHiPs| Nakura 
| Episode: "Force Seven"
|-
| Ivanhoe 
| Front-de-Boeuf
| Television film
|-
| 1983
| Reilly, Ace of Spies 
| Tanyatos
|Episode: "An Affair with a Married Woman"
|-
| rowspan=2 | 1984
| Robin of Sherwood| King Richard
| Episode: "The King's Fool"
|-
| Scarecrow and Mrs. King| Lord Bromfield
| Episode: "Affair at Bromfield Hall"
|-
| rowspan=2 | 1987
| Marjorie and the Preacher Man| Seymour
| Television drama
|-
| The Little Match Girl| Police Chief Murphy
| Television film
|-
| 1988–94
| Murder, She Wrote| Harry Mordecai / Harry Waverly / Lancaster
| 3 episodes
|-
| rowspan=3 | 1988
| Noble House| Quillan Gornt
| Miniseries
|-
| War and Remembrance| Sammy Mutterperl
| Miniseries
|-
| Goddess of Love| Zeus
| Television film
|-
| rowspan=2 | 1989
| The Trial of the Incredible Hulk 
| Wilson Fisk/Kingpin
| Television film
|-
| Great Expectations 
| Joe Gargery
| Miniseries
|-
| rowspan=3 | 1991 
| The Mystery of the Black Jungle| O'Connor
| Miniseries
|-
| Tales from the Crypt| Duval
| Episode: "Dead Wait"
|-
| The Strauss Dynasty| Gribov
| Miniseries
|-
| rowspan=4 | 1992
| Batman: The Animated Series 
| Waclaw Jozek / Baron
| Voice, episode: "The Cape and Cowl Conspiracy" 
|-
| Perry Mason 
| Phillip Graff
| Episode: "The Case of the Fatal Framing" 
|-
| Archaeology: Voyages of the Vikings| Narrator
| Documentary series (TLC)
|-
| Ring of the Musketeers| Maurice Treville
| Television film
|-
| 1992–93
| The Legend of Prince Valiant 
| King Hugo, King Donovan
| Voice, 8 episodes
|-
| 1993–94
| The Untouchables| Agent Malone
| 15 episodes
|-
| 1994
| A Flintstones Christmas Carol 
| Charles Brickens
| Television special
|-
| 1995–96
| Gargoyles| Macbeth
| Voice, 13 episodes
|-
| 1995–97
| Sliders| Professor Maximillian Arturo
| 40 episodes
|-
| rowspan=2 | 1995
| Fantastic Four 
| Thor
| Voice, 2 episodes
|-
| Archaeology: Florida's Lost Empire| Host
| Documentary series (TLC)
|-
| rowspan=3 | 1996
| The Incredible Hulk| Thor
| Voice, episode: "Mortal Bounds"
|-
| Boo to You Too! Winnie the Pooh| Narrator
| Voice, television special
|-
| Mortal Kombat: Defenders of the Realm 
| Asgarth
| Episode: "Overthrown"
|-
| rowspan=3 | 1997
| Freakazoid!| Professor Beasthead
| Voice, episode: "Tomb of Invisibo"
|-
| You Wish| Madman Mustapha
| 3 episodes
|-
| Star Trek: Voyager| Leonardo da Vinci
| 2 episodes
|-
| 1999
| Au Pair| Nigel Kent
| Television film
|-
| 2000
| Britannic 
| Captain Charles Bartlett 
| Television film
|-
| rowspan=2 | 2002
| Justice League| Hades
| Voice, episode: "Paradise Lost"
|-
| The Zeta Project| Edgar Mandragora
| Voice, episode: "Ro's Gift" 
|-
| 2000–02
| SpongeBob SquarePants| Man Ray
| Voice
|-
| 2002
| Fillmore!| Lenny
| Voice, episode: "Ingrid Third, Public Enemy #1" 
|-
| 2003
| Helen of Troy| King Priam
| Miniseries
|-
| 2004
| Dragon Storm| King Fastrad
| Television film
|-
| 2005
| Revelations (Omnium Finis Imminet)
| Professor Jonah Lampley
| Miniseries
|-
| 2006
| Super Robot Monkey Team Hyperforce Go!| Captain Proteus
| Voice, episode: "Demon of the Deep"
|-
| rowspan=3 | 2008
| Anaconda 3: Offspring 
| Murdoch
| Television film
|-
| Fire & Ice: The Dragon Chronicles 
| Sangimel
| Television film
|-
|Kiss Me Deadly| Yale Ericson
| Television film
|-
| rowspan=3 | 2009
| Dark Days in Monkey City| Narrator
| 3 episodes
|-
| Anacondas: Trail of Blood| Murdoch
| Television film
|-
| Kröd Mändoon and the Flaming Sword of Fire| Grimshank
| 3 episodes
|-
| rowspan=3 | 2010 
| Legend of the Seeker| Horace
| Episode: "Vengeance"
|-
| Three Wise Women| Archangel Green
| Television film
|-
| Medium Raw: Night of the Wolf| Elliot Carbon
| Television film
|- 
| rowspan=2 | 2012
| Psych| Museum curator
| Episode: "Indiana Shawn and the Temple of the Kinda Crappy, Rusty Old Dagger"
|-
| Missing Christmas| Narrator, Santa Claus
| Television special
|-
| rowspan=2 | 2014
| Let The Season In| Narrator
| Mormon Tabernacle Choir Christmas Concert Special (filmed in 2013)
|-
| Once Upon a Time| Grand Pabbie
| Voice, 3 episodes
|-
| rowspan="2"| 2015
| Killing Jesus| Annas
| Television film
|-
| The Adventures of Puss in Boots| Goodsword
| Voice, episode: "Sword"
|-
| 2015–2016
| TripTank| Various voices
| 7 episodes
|-
| rowspan="3"| 2016
| The Shannara Chronicles| Eventine Elessedil
| 7 episodes
|-
| Winter Thaw| Martin Avdeitch
| Television film
|-
| The Lion Guard| King Sokwe
| Voice, episode: "The Lost Gorillas"
|-
| 2018
| A Dickens Christmas (Mormon Tabernacle Choir)| Narrator
| Mormon Tabernacle Choir Christmas Concert Special
|-
| 2019
| Fresh Eggs| Cutter Anderson
| 6 episodes
|-
| 2020
| Wizards: Tales of Arcadia| Galahad
| Voice; 7 episodes
|-
| 2022
| Documentary Now!| Garth Davies-Gruffudd
| Episode: "How They Threw Rocks"
|}

Video games

AudiobooksIndiana Jones and the Last Crusade (1989 Buena Vista Records)Rescued (2006)Sir Malcolm and the Missing Prince (2009)Affabel: Window of Eternity (2007 John Bevere, 2009 Bethany House)The Extraordinary Adventures of G. A. Henty: In the Reign of Terror (2016)The Trials of Saint Patrick (2017)

PodcastsBatman Unburied (2022, as Hugo Strange)

References

External links

Article about controversial statements 18 January 2004.
Andrew Leigh, "No Sean Penn". National Review''. 5 March 2004.

1944 births
Living people
Alumni of RADA
Alumni of the University of East Anglia
Audiobook narrators
Outstanding Performance by a Cast in a Motion Picture Screen Actors Guild Award winners
People educated at Truro School
People from Ammanford
People from Carmarthenshire
People from Salisbury
People from Watton, Norfolk
Welsh male film actors
Welsh male stage actors
Welsh male television actors
Welsh male video game actors
Welsh male voice actors
20th-century Welsh male actors
21st-century Welsh male actors